Harshvardhan Bajpai is an Indian politician from the Bharatiya Janata Party. He is active in politics since 2007. Before joining BJP he was in the Bahujan Samaj Party. He is a one-time Member of the Legislative Assembly from Allahabad North Assembly constituency in Allahabad of Uttar Pradesh.

Education

He went to St. Joseph's College, Allahabad. He got his bachelor's degree in software engineering from University of Sheffield in England and Masters in Finance & Control from the Department of Financial Studies of the University of Delhi South Campus.

Family

Harshvardhan Bajpai was born on 30 July 1980. His father Ashok Kumar Bajpai won in 1980 from Allahabad North (Assembly constituency) on ticket of Indian National Congress was a Member of the Legislative Assembly (India). His mother Ranjana Bajpai was national president of the Samajwadi Party Mahila Sabha-the party women's wing. He is grandson of congress stalwart Rajendra Kumari Bajpai former Union Minister of India and D.N. Bajpai was teacher by profession.

Career

He won in Uttar Pradesh assembly election in 2017 with a margin of 35035 on ticket of BJP defeating Anugrah Narayan Singh of congress who is four-time Member of the Legislative Assembly. This margin is the highest in history of Allahabad North (Assembly constituency).

References

Living people
Bharatiya Janata Party politicians from Uttar Pradesh
Uttar Pradesh MLAs 2017–2022
1980 births
Bahujan Samaj Party politicians
Uttar Pradesh MLAs 2022–2027